Charles Rothwell was an English footballer. His regular position was as a forward. He played for Newton Heath from 1893 to 1897.

External links
MUFCInfo.com profile

English footballers
Manchester United F.C. players
Year of death missing
Year of birth missing
Association football forwards